= Azerbaijan Today =

Azerbaijan Today is a bi-monthly English-language magazine published in Azerbaijan. The magazine was established in January 2001. It primarily covers articles on politics, business and economics.
